Basketball (and Other Things): A Collection of Questions Asked, Answered, Illustrated is a 2017 book written by Shea Serrano and illustrated by Arturo Torres, with a foreword from former NBA star Reggie Miller.

Development and publication history 
Basketball (and Other Things) was published by Abrams Image on October 10, 2017. It is the second collaboration between Serrano and Torres, following their 2015 New York Times best-seller The Rap Year Book. Basketball (and Other Things) shares a title with a previous email newsletter from Serrano and Torres; begun in March 2016, the newsletter had over 30,000 subscribers as of May 2016.

When pre-sales opened on Amazon for Basketball (and Other Things) in February 2017, the book hit number 13 on the site's bestseller list. When Barnes & Noble announced in June that they were producing a special edition to include basketball cards with the book sold only in their stores, Basketball (and Other Things) made it to number one on Barnes & Noble's Top 100 Bestselling Books list.

In November 2017, the book reached number one on The New York Times Best Sellers list for sports and fitness books.

On December 31, 2017, former United States President Barack Obama listed Serrano's book as one of his favorite books of the year, a "bonus for hoops fans."

Chapters

The start of each of the book's 33 chapters has a full-page illustration of an iconic jersey of a player who wore the chapter's number, except for chapter 18 which features an illustration of the fictional action-movie character John Harder, played by James Harden.

References

2017 non-fiction books
Basketball books
Comedy books